Nancy Elizabeth Teed (February 26, 1949 – January 29, 1993) was a Canadian politician.

Born in Saint John, New Brunswick, she was elected to Legislative Assembly of New Brunswick in the riding of Saint John South in the 1978 election. A Progressive Conservative, she was re-elected in 1982. She held three positions in the cabinet of Richard Hatfield: Minister of Social Services, Minister of Health and Community Services, and Minister responsible for the Alcoholism and Drug Dependency Commission.

She was summoned to the Senate of Canada in 1990 representing the senatorial division of Saint John, NB sitting as a Progressive Conservative.

She was killed in a car accident near Oromocto, New Brunswick in January 1993, while in office as Senator.
Her funeral was held at Trinity Anglican Church in Saint John, New Brunswick.

References

External links
 

1949 births
1993 deaths
Road incident deaths in Canada
Canadian senators from New Brunswick
Progressive Conservative Party of New Brunswick MLAs
Politicians from Saint John, New Brunswick
Progressive Conservative Party of Canada senators
Women MLAs in New Brunswick
Women members of the Senate of Canada
Accidental deaths in New Brunswick
20th-century Canadian women politicians